The Cockscomb is a high mountain in the Eastern Cape, in South Africa. It gets its name from its resemblance to a fowl's comb. It is situated in the Baviaanskloof region and the nearest town is Patensie. The Cockscomb is part of the Groot Winterhoek range.

References 

Mountains of the Eastern Cape